Heliothis leucosticta is a species of moth of the family Noctuidae first described by George Hampson in 1902. It is found in Africa, including Botswana and South Africa.

External links
 

Heliothis
Moths of Africa
Moths described in 1902